Super Yolanda is a type of firecracker released in December 2013. It is named after Typhoon Haiyan, known as Super Typhoon Yolanda in the Philippines.

Legality 
In the Philippines, Super Yolanda is included on the list of dangerous firecrackers, according to the Department of Health. Super Yolanda is now illegal in the country.

See also 
 Judas' belt - another kind of firecracker
 Quarter stick
 M-1000s

References 

Fireworks